Vernell Eufaye "Bimbo" Coles (born April 22, 1968) is an American retired professional basketball player. He received his nickname from a cousin in reference to a country music song of the same name.

Coles was a standout at Greenbrier East High School in Lewisburg, West Virginia. At Greenbrier East, Coles played basketball, baseball and football. Coles was more heavily recruited to play college football than basketball before announcing his intent to play basketball in college. In football, he was twice named all-state and once named All-America. As a shortstop and outfielder, Coles claimed to be selected by the Philadelphia Phillies in the 1986 Major League Baseball draft. He was recruited to play college basketball at Virginia Tech, Maryland and West Virginia.

He played his college basketball for the Virginia Tech Hokies for four seasons from 1986 to 1990. Coles set the school and Metro Conference records for career points and the school record for career assists. He was inducted into the Virginia Tech Sports Hall of Fame and West Virginia Sports Hall of Fame. He was a member of the United States national basketball team which won a bronze medal in the 1988 Summer Olympics. Despite not having played baseball since high school, Coles was drafted by the California Angels in the final round of the 1990 Major League Baseball draft.

His NBA career started when he was selected by the Sacramento Kings in the 1990 NBA Draft, and immediately traded to the Miami Heat in exchange for veteran guard Rory Sparrow. After Coles' first of two stints with the Miami Heat, he was traded to the Golden State Warriors, and also played with the Atlanta Hawks, Cleveland Cavaliers, and Boston Celtics. He was utilized primarily as a backup point guard.

Coles' brother, Sidney, played basketball for two years at Memphis and for two years at Marshall, one of which was under head coach Billy Donovan. In 2000, Sidney was hired as an assistant coach at Wyoming under head coach Steve McClain.  Until 2021, Coles coached at his alma mater of Greenbrier East High School in Lewisburg, West Virginia.

References

External links

 NBA stats @ www.basketball-reference.com
 NBA stats @ www.nba.com
 NCAA stats @ www.sports-reference.com

1968 births
Living people
American men's basketball players
Atlanta Hawks players
Basketball coaches from Virginia
Basketball players at the 1988 Summer Olympics
Basketball players from Virginia
Boston Celtics players
Cleveland Cavaliers players
Golden State Warriors players
Medalists at the 1988 Summer Olympics
Miami Heat assistant coaches
Miami Heat players
Olympic bronze medalists for the United States in basketball
People from Lewisburg, West Virginia
People from Covington, Virginia
Point guards
Sacramento Kings draft picks
United States men's national basketball team players
Virginia Tech Hokies men's basketball players